"El harba wine" is a single from Khaled's album Kenza. "El Harba Wine" loosely translates to "Run away, but where to?". Khaled explains the title as "You want to leave your country? Where do you want to go?". The song is also sometimes referred to by the title "El Harba". The credited writers for the lyrics are Mohamed Angar Khaled, Amar, and Mohamed Benhamadouche, and for the music Khaled and Idir.

Versions and release history
"El Harba Wine" is an Arabic cover version of "Zwit Rwit", an Amazigh song sung by Idir. The original Arabic cover version was recorded by Khaled in 1987 and released in 1988. The release coincided with Algeria's civil unrest of October 1988.

A live version of the song was included in Khaled's live album Hafla. A rare flamenco inspired version of the song was included in Sahra's promotional CD. Khaled's 1999 album Kenza included a remake of "El Harba Wine" featuring Indian fused beats and Hindi verses sung by Amar.  Billboard described this version as a "mesmerizing merging" of Khaled and Amar's singing, "equal parts world music and tribal house".

Track listings

CD Single - Version 1
"El Harba Wine (Edit Version)" - 3:50
"Mele h'bibti" - 6:29
"El Harba (unreleased version)" - 4:13 (from 1996)
"El Harba (Live Version)" - 7:08 (from the album "Hafla")

CD Single (Remixes)
"El Harba Wine (Edit Version)" - 3:50
"El Harba Wine (Afro Vocal)" (Remixed by Funk Master VS Lucky Luke) - 6:42
"El Harba Wine (Mania 1000 Mix)" (Remixed by Fabrice Leyni) - 4:29
"El Harba Wine (Last Stand of the Fortress Mix)" (Remixed by Transglobal Underground) - 6:04
"El Harba Wine (Nitin Sawhney Mix)" (Remixed by Nitin Sawhney) - 5:25

12" Single
"El Harba Wine (Afro Vocal Mix)" (Remixed by Funk Master VS Lucky Luke) - 6:47
"El Harba Wine (Deep Club Mix)" (Remixed by Magma 2001) - 7:50
"El Harba Wine (Dodgie Mix)" (Remixed by Funk Master VS Lucky Luke) - 6:49
"El Harba Wine (Powerful Dub)" (Remixed by Funk Master VS Lucky Luke) - 6:11

References

External links
 

2000 singles
Khaled (musician) songs
Amar (British singer) songs
1987 songs
Barclay (record label) singles